Enchanted Wood may refer to:

The Enchanted Wood (H. P. Lovecraft), fictional place in H. P. Lovecraft's Dream Cycle located in the Dreamlands
The Enchanted Wood (book), the first book in Enid Blyton's The Magic Faraway Tree series
The Enchanted Wood (music), a French musical project